Klokot (Serbian Cyrillic: Клокот) or Kllokot, is a town and municipality in the District of Gjilan in southeastern Kosovo. The municipality was established on 8 January 2010, the settlements having been part of the municipality of Viti. The seat of the municipality is in the town of Klokot.

Geography 
Klokot is situated in the geographical region of Kosovo Pomoravlje, in the southeastern part of Kosovo.

The municipality includes the town of Klokot and three villages:
 Klokot
 Mogila (Mogillë)
 Vrbovac
 Grnčar

History 

On 16 August 1999, after the Kosovo War, a mortar attack carried out by Albanians killed two Serb civilians in the village. There had earlier that month been two mortar attacks.

In August 2003, explosive devices planted in Klokot destroyed five Serb houses, with several injuries, including two American KFOR soldiers.

The municipality of Klokot was officially established on 8 January 2010, previously being part of the Vitina Municipality. The seat of the municipality is in Klokot. This and other new-formed municipalities of Kosovo are not recognized by Serbian government, which still considers it part of Vitina municipality. The municipality was formed based on the Ahtisaari plan for decentralization of Kosovo which called for the establishment of a municipality with Serbian majority within the Vitina municipality.

Between 2014 and March 2016, 30 Serb families with 124 members have left the municipality. In December 2016, two local Serb youngsters were stabbed by a group of six Albanians. The week before, a house of a Serb returnee family had been burnt down.

For 2016, the estimated budget for the municipality was €800,000.

The municipality is planned to be included in the Community of Serb Municipalities, according to the Brussels Agreement (2013).

Economy
The economy of the municipality of is mainly based on natural resources (mostly mineral water), tourism (two private spas), agriculture and small trade businesses. There are 29 registered private businesses operating in the municipality.

Public services
There are three elementary schools in the municipality with 599 students and 33 teachers, one secondary school with 147 students and 13 teachers and one kindergarten with 15 children and 2 teachers. Two elementary schools follow Serbian curricula, while one follows Kosovo curricula. The St. Sava Elementary school in Klokot is attended by 250 students and the secondary school is located in Vrbovac.

Culture
The municipality has four Serbian Orthodox churches. The church in Grnčar was reported to have been mined and destroyed during the Kosovo conflict, and was later fully reconstructed. There is a mosque in village of Mogila which was not damaged during the conflict.

Politics
The first (and most recent to day) municipal elections were held on 15 November 2009. Although Serbian Government did not recognize those elections, 25,4% of local voters, mostly Serbs, did participate in the elections. Serb Saša Mirković was elected mayor. Out of 15 members of the municipal assembly, ten were elected from the Serb Independent Liberal Party, and five from the Albanian Democratic League of Kosovo. In November 2017, Božidar Dejanović of the Serb List became the new mayor of Klokot.

Demographics
The municipality of Klokot has a Serb majority and Albanian minority. The ECMI calculated, based on 2010 and 2013 estimations, that the Klokot municipality was inhabited by 3,500 Serbs (71.23%). The town of Klokot had 1,500 residents before the Kosovo War (1998–99), and 1,200 in 2001.

According to the 2011 census, which is unreliable due to partial boycott by Serbs and other minorities, the town of Klokot alone had 1,064 residents, 616 Serbs (57.89%), 446 Albanians (41.91%), and 2 others; the municipality had 2,556 residents, 1,362 Albanians (53.29%), 1,177 Serbs (40.05%), 9 Romani (0.35%), 1 Turk (0.04%) and 7 Others and unspecified (0.27%). The number of residents before the Kosovo War was estimated to have been 5,000 in what is today the Klokot municipality.

Annotations

See also
Municipalities of Kosovo
Cities and towns in Kosovo
List of populated places in Kosovo

References

Sources

External links 

 Municipality of Klokot
 Radio Klokot
 

Serbian enclaves in Kosovo
Populated places in Kosovo
Municipalities of Kosovo